The Folsom Complex is a Paleo-Indian archaeological culture that occupied much of central North America from c. 8500 BCE to c. 4000 BCE. The term was first used in 1927 by Jesse Dade Figgins, director of the Colorado Museum of Natural History.

Numerous Paleoindian cultures occupied North America, with some restricted to the Great Plains and Great Lakes of the modern United States of America and Canada as well as adjacent areas to the west and south west. The Folsom Tradition was characterised by use of Folsom points as projectile tips and activities known from kill sites where slaughter and butchering of bison took place and Folsom tools were left behind.

Some kill sites exhibit evidence of up to 50 bison being killed, although the Folsom diet apparently included mountain sheep, marmots, deer and cottontail rabbit as well.

The Folsom Hanson Site in Wyoming also revealed areas of hardstanding, which indicate possible dwellings.

The type site is Folsom site, near Folsom, New Mexico, in Colfax County (29CX1), a marsh-side kill site found in about 1908 by George McJunkin, a cowboy and former slave who had lived in Texas as a child.  Archaeologists excavated the site in 1926.

The Folsom Complex dates to between 9000 BC and 8000 BC and is thought to have derived from the earlier Clovis culture.

The Lindenmeier site in Colorado is a campsite that was used throughout a longer period, spanning this era.

References

Archaeology of Canada
Archaeology of the United States
Archaeological cultures of North America
Hunter-gatherers of the United States
Hunter-gatherers of Canada
Native American history of Colorado
Paleo-Indian period
Pre-Columbian cultures
Prehistoric cultures in Colorado
9th-millennium BC establishments
8th-millennium BC disestablishments